The 1873 Wakatipu by-election was a by-election held on 19 August 1873 in the  electorate during the 5th New Zealand Parliament.

The by-election was caused by the resignation of the incumbent MP Bendix Hallenstein on 17 July 1873.

The by-election was won by Vincent Pyke, described as a Government supporter.

It appears that four people were nominated on 16 August, and a poll was held on 19 August. H. Manders won the "show of hands", but may have lost through accidentally being prevented from visiting Cardrona, Macetown, etc.

The other candidates were Vincent Pyke, George Elliott Barton and Alexander Innes.

Results

References

Wakatipu 1873
1873 elections in New Zealand
August 1873 events
Politics of Otago
Queenstown-Lakes District